Holy Trinity Cathedral, in Kowloon, Hong Kong, is a cathedral for the Anglican Eastern Kowloon diocese. It was established in 1890, making it one of the oldest Anglican churches in Hong Kong. The cathedral is one of the three Anglican cathedrals of the Hong Kong Anglican church (the other two are St John's Cathedral and All Saints' Cathedral).

History 
The cathedral was established as Holy Trinity Church in 1890 and consecrated a cathedral in 2010. The church had been rebuilt twice in nearby locations before finally settled down in their current location at 135 Ma Tau Chung Road, Kowloon. The current structure was built in 1937 and designed by Ng Kin-chung, a draftsman from Leigh and Orange, an architectural firm. The church combines western and traditional Chinese architectural styles. Reinforced concrete structure and traditional Chinese decorations can be seen inside the church and on its roof respectively. It has survived some serious damages during the Japanese occupation in the Second World War between 1941 and 1945.

The Diocesan Office is located in the nearby Holy Trinity Bradbury Centre, on 139 Ma Tau Chung Road. Holy Trinity Centre Kindergarten & Day Nursery, an affiliated school of the cathedral, is also located in Holy Trinity Bradbury Centre.

Governance 
The cathedral, like other Anglican churches in Hong Kong, is part of the worldwide Anglican Communion. It is under the Diocese of Eastern Kowloon of the Hong Kong Sheng Kung Hui.

Footnotes

See also 

List of Anglican churches in Hong Kong
List of Grade II historic buildings in Hong Kong 
List of the oldest buildings and structures in Hong Kong
List of cathedrals § Asia
List of cathedrals in Hong Kong

References

External links 
  

	
Anglican church buildings in Hong Kong
Anglican cathedrals in Asia
Anglican Diocese of Eastern Kowloon
Cathedrals in Hong Kong
Kowloon City District